Nam-mahani (nam-maḫ-ni) was a Sumerian ruler, and the last ensi of Lagash circa 2100 BCE (middle chronology), roughly contemporaneous with the last king of Akkad, Shu-turul. His reign was followed by that of Utu-hengal, who destroyed the power of the Gutian Dynasty, and put and end to the power of the various city-states, reunifying the Sumerian realm.

Inscriptions
Nam-mahani is known from various inscriptions, and especially a macehead dedicated by queen Nininimgina and bearing the name of King Nam-Mahani, to god Kindazi:

Other objects

References

22nd-century BC Sumerian kings
Kings of Lagash